Summer Lyn Glau (born July 24, 1981 is an American actress best known for her roles in science fiction and fantasy television series: as River Tam in Firefly (2002) and its continuation film Serenity (2005), as Tess Doerner in The 4400 (2005–2007), as Cameron in Terminator: The Sarah Connor Chronicles (2008–2009), and as Isabel Rochev/Ravager in Arrow (2013–2014).

Early life
Glau was born in San Antonio, Texas, where she grew up with her two younger sisters Kaitlin and Christie. She is of Scots-Irish and German ancestry. Her mother is a schoolteacher, and her father a general contractor.

Glau received a scholarship to a ballet company and was homeschooled from grades 3 to 12 to accommodate her ballet training. In addition to her classical ballet training, she studied tango and flamenco. After a broken toe ended her dancing career, Glau moved to Los Angeles in 2002 to pursue acting.

Career

Glau's first television credit was a guest role as a ballerina on a 2002 episode of the television series Angel. There she caught the eye of director Joss Whedon who later cast her in his critically acclaimed but short-lived TV series Firefly as River Tam, a role she reprised for the show's feature film sequel Serenity. Glau previously auditioned for the role of a Power Ranger (White Wild Force Ranger Alyssa Enrilé) in Power Rangers Wild Force but lost to actress Jessica Rey before meeting Whedon.

Glau appeared on the episode "Love Conquers Al" of the TV series Cold Case. She had a small role in the film Sleepover, in which she played the high school senior Shelly. She also appeared in the CSI: Crime Scene Investigation episode "What's Eating Gilbert Grissom?", and season two of The Unit as Crystal Burns (the girlfriend of Jeremy Erhart). In 2006, Glau played Tess Doerner, a paranoid schizophrenic returnee in season two's premiere of The 4400, and became a recurring character from season three onwards. She also starred in the horror comedy film Mammoth. Glau was cast in the ABC Family TV movie The Initiation of Sarah.

In Terminator: The Sarah Connor Chronicles, a series that debuted January 13, 2008, Glau played the role of Cameron Phillips, a Terminator infiltration unit sent back to protect John Connor and Sarah Connor from Skynet. The series' seventh episode, "The Demon Hand", included several scenes in which Glau (in character as Cameron) dances ballet; Glau also played Allison Young (Cameron's human doppelgänger) in the second season episodes "Allison from Palmdale" and "Born to Run". Glau also guest starred as herself in a 2009 episode of the CBS situation comedy The Big Bang Theory.

On August 26, 2009, it was confirmed after much speculation that Glau would be joining the cast of Joss Whedon's Dollhouse for at least two episodes in season two's early part. She portrayed Bennett, the programmer for a rival Dollhouse. On March 12, 2010, it was announced that she would be joining the cast of NBC's The Cape in a leading role. In June 2010, she was confirmed as the female lead in the horror comedy film Knights of Badassdom. On July 11, 2011, Glau was cast on Alphas as Skylar Adams, a recurring alpha and mother to Zoe Adams, and a former acquaintance of Dr. Rosen and Nina. Glau voiced Kara Zor-El in the DC Comics original animated movie Superman/Batman: Apocalypse.

Glau was cast in the recurring role of Miss Jones on the Netflix crime drama series Wu Assassins.

Personal life
Glau has been married to Val Morrison since 2014. In January 2015, Glau gave birth to her first daughter. She gave birth to her second daughter in October 2017.

Filmography

Film

Television

Online media

Awards and nominations

References

External links

 

1981 births
21st-century American actresses
Actresses from San Antonio
American ballerinas
American female dancers
American dancers
American film actresses
American people of German descent
American people of Scotch-Irish descent
American television actresses
American voice actresses
Living people